Negomir is a commune in Gorj County, Oltenia, Romania. It is composed of ten villages: Artanu, Bohorel, Condeiești, Negomir, Nucetu, Orzu, Paltinu, Raci, Ursoaia and Valea Racilor.

References

Communes in Gorj County
Localities in Oltenia